The 2014–15 season was the club's 2nd season in the Scottish Premiership and their third consecutive appearance in the top flight of Scottish football. Ross County also competed in the League Cup and the Scottish Cup.

Summary

Management
Ross County began the 2014–15 season under the management of Derek Adams. On 28 August 2014, after a poor start to the season, Adams was sacked along with his father who was director of football at the club. On 9 September 2014, Jim McIntyre joined from Scottish Championship side Queen of the South with Billy Dodds as his assistant.

Season summary
County lost their first 7 games of the season and were rock-bottom of The Premiership. After the sacking of Derek Adams in late August, in September, they hired Jim McIntyre and started to pick up results. With County still bottom, McIntyre was backed by the board to bring in some new players. They failed to win a match between end of November to the end of January. After the 4-0 defeat away to Aberdeen in early February, County went on an unbeaten run up to the split, winning 8 of the next 9 matches. On 13 April, Liam Boyce scored the club's first ever top-flight hat-trick for County in a 3-0 win at St Mirren. On 16 May, County secured their Premiership status for the 2015-16 season after winning 2-1 against Hamilton Academical.

Results and fixtures

Pre season / Friendlies

Scottish Premiership

Scottish League Cup

Scottish Cup

Squad statistics
During the 2014–15 season, Ross County have used thirty four different players in competitive games. The table below shows the number of appearances and goals scored by each player. This table also shows players who were on the bench and did not play.

Appearances

|-
|colspan="12"|Players who left the club during the 2014–15 season
|-

|}

Disciplinary record
Includes all competitive matches.
Last updated 23 May 2015

Goal scorers

Team statistics

League table

Results by round

Results by opponent
Ross County score first

Source: 2014–15 Scottish Premier League Results Table

Awards

Player of the Month

Manager of the Month

Transfers

Players In

Players Out

See also
 List of Ross County F.C. seasons

Notes and references

Ross County
Ross County F.C. seasons